Barbara Schwarzfeldt (born 8 May 1957) is a German former swimmer who won a bronze medal in the 200 m butterfly at the 1974 European Aquatics Championships. She competed at the 1972 Summer Olympics in a very different event, 800 m freestyle, and was eliminated in the preliminaries.

Nationally, she won five titles: in the 200 m (1974) and 400 m (1976) freestyle, 200 m butterfly (1974, 1975) and 400 m medley (1976).

References

1957 births
Living people
German female swimmers
German female freestyle swimmers
German female butterfly swimmers
German female medley swimmers
Swimmers at the 1972 Summer Olympics
Olympic swimmers of West Germany
Sportspeople from Krefeld
European Aquatics Championships medalists in swimming
20th-century German women
21st-century German women